The Knox United Church, began as Knox Presbyterian Church in Scarborough, Toronto, Ontario, Canada, in a wood-frame church built in 1848, the result of the Church of Scotland disruption, that led to the formation of the Presbyterian Church of Canada in Connection with the Free Church of Scotland.

Elder William Clarke, Sr., was one of the group who withdrew from the "Auld Kirk" at the Synod Meeting held in Kingston, Canada West in July, 1844; his Minister, Rev. James George, and much of the Presbyterian Church at Scarborough in Connection with the Church of Scotland (now St. Andrew's Presbyterian Church, Scarborough located north of Thomson Memorial Park) remained.

The original Knox Congregation (named after Scottish Church reformer John Knox) met first with another congregation located in York Mills, until settling in the developing Scarborough Township village of Agincourt.

40 local residents became the first communicants of Knox Presbyterian Church, originally known as "Knox's Church Scarboro".

In 1853, it became the centre of the "Scarborough Township Pastoral Charge", along with Melville (formed 1851) in West Hill, Zion Church, Cedar Grove (formed 1855), in Markham Township,  Chalmers Church, York Town Line (1863–1890), and other occasional preaching points.

By 1883, Knox Church had grown to become a single-point charge.

With a growing membership, the current brick church was built in 1872.

This church still stands at the corner of Sheppard Avenue East and Midland Avenue, surrounded by a large cemetery containing many early settlers, and a number of prominent Church leaders.

In 1925, this Presbyterian congregation voted 136–106 to be part of the new United Church of Canada. A number of members left to form a "Continuing" Knox Presbyterian Church, now located nearby at 4156 Sheppard Avenue East.

The Christian Education Centre was added in the 1950s.

See also
List of oldest buildings and structures in Toronto
List of United Church of Canada churches in Toronto

External links
Knox United Church Website

References

United Church of Canada churches in Toronto
Buildings and structures in Scarborough, Toronto
19th-century Presbyterian churches
Gothic Revival architecture in Toronto
Churches completed in 1848
Churches completed in 1872
Gothic Revival church buildings in Canada
19th-century churches in Canada